World Statistics Day is an international day to celebrate statistics.  Created by the United Nations Statistical Commission, it was first celebrated on 20 October 2010.  The day is celebrated every five years.

, 103 countries celebrate a national Statistics Day, including 51 African countries that jointly celebrate African Statistics Day annually on 18 November. India celebrates its statistics day on 29 June, the birthday of the statistician Prasanta Chandra Mahalanobis.  The Royal Statistical Society in the UK also launched its getstats statistical literacy campaign on the same day at 20:10 (on 20.10.2010).

References

External links 
 Official site 2020
 Official site 2010

United Nations days
October observances
Recurring events established in 2010